Lanemeyer/Emanuel Nice Split is a split single released by the bands Lanemeyer and Emanuel Nice in 2000. Only 500 copies ever made of this split

Track listing

References

Split EPs
2000 EPs
Emanuel (band) EPs